Joint War College, is an academic institution of the Turkish Armed Forces, founded in 1848. It was renamed the Armed Forces College in 1964, having previously been the Joint War College. It's renamed Joint War College again in 2016.

Other military colleges
It must not be confused with Ottoman Military College (Mekteb-i Harbiye), Turkish Military Academy (Kara Harp Okulu) and Army War Institute (Kara Harp Enstitüsü), and National Security College (Milli Güvenlik Akademisi).

References

1848 establishments in the Ottoman Empire
Military academies of Turkey